Milson Randrianasolo (born 25 September 1957) is a Malagasy boxer. He competed in the men's lightweight event at the 1984 Summer Olympics.

References

1957 births
Living people
Malagasy male boxers
Olympic boxers of Madagascar
Boxers at the 1984 Summer Olympics
Place of birth missing (living people)
Lightweight boxers